KFXR (1190 kHz) is a commercial AM radio station in Dallas, Texas, and serving the Dallas/Fort Worth Metroplex. It is owned by iHeartMedia and airs a talk radio format. Its studios and offices are located along Dallas Parkway in Farmers Branch (with a Dallas address). The daytime transmitter is in Irving, using a directional antenna with a four-tower array. The nighttime transmitter is in Rockwall, using a twelve-tower array directional antenna.

While it is owned by iHeartMedia, KFXR does not have access to three of the most popular talk shows syndicated by iHeartMedia's Premiere Networks. Sean Hannity is heard on KSKY (660 AM) and both Glenn Beck and "Coast to Coast AM with George Noory" are found on KLIF (570 AM). Because of this, KFXR must rely on several local and regional hosts, such as Russ Martin from sister station KEGL, and from Houston, Michael Berry based at iHeartMedia's KTRH.  Also heard on weekdays are Guy Benson from Fox News Radio and "Free Talk Live," based in New Hampshire.

Paid brokered programming shows are heard middays and weekends; including Texas Tech Red Raiders football and Men's Basketball.  World and national news from Fox News Radio starts most hours, while local news is provided by Fox O&O KDFW.

History

Early years
Its first call sign was KLIF.

The station was owned by Trinity Broadcasting, with studios in a 12th floor penthouse apartment in Cliff Towers.

Top 40 KLIF era
KLIF achieved recognition in radio broadcasting through the efforts of noted programmer Gordon McLendon. The station became Dallas' and one of the nation's biggest Top 40 radio stations. It virtually defined the hit music format for 1950s and 1960s Top 40 radio, reaching an over 50 share in the Dallas ratings, an unparalleled ratings success.

In 1954, 1190 KLIF switched from a varied music and talk format to one that focused on hit songs with periodic news.  McLendon collected the names of local leaders in business and government, and worked them into news on the station.  McLendon said there were only two things that radio could compete with television on, "music and news". KLIF was headquartered at KLIF Triangle Point Studios from 1964 to 1980. It is a street front building with large windows where pedestrians and Downtown Dallas shoppers could look in the studio and see the action of live broadcasts. KLIF was known for its promotions which included top 40 surveys with photo shoots of the disc jockeys. Other photos showed the broadcast staff at live promotion events. KLIF hosted live music shows in different parts of Dallas. The announcers often toured the city in KLIF radio vehicles.

When Top 40 music listening switched from AM to FM during the late 1970s, the station lost its dominance in the format and later switched to talk radio. Nights continued from the five tower site on Scheme Road in south-east Dallas. In 1968, a complicated antenna system (12 towers to protect other stations on AM 1190) was built near Rockwall, Texas. In 1990, the KLIF call letters and talk format were moved to 570 AM, with AM 1190 being bought by Greystone Broadcasting.

Switch to News
A temporary automated format of CNN Headline News was put on AM 1190 along with the call letters KLAF while Greystone built new studios and planned a new approach.  Greystone added local news in the morning and afternoon drive time along with syndicated talk shows, including Bruce Williams and Larry King, to the Headline News format, changing the call sign to KYII - "Keeping You Instantly Informed."  KHYI, a popular FM top 40 station at the time (now KLTY), protested the AM station's call letters, saying they were too similar to KHYI. Because of this, Greystone agreed to change to KUII in 1991.  That same year, KUII added the Rush Limbaugh show to the lineup live from 11am-2pm.  It had previously aired on weekend afternoons on KLIF.  Limbaugh quickly became the sole ratings hit on KUII.  In the summer of 1992, the station hired a local psychologist to do a talk show in the morning and added an afternoon sports talk show with former Dallas Cowboys player Tony Hill from 3-6pm.

Former KLIF 1190 announcers
Gordon McLendon, Jimmy Rabbitt, Paxton Mills, Ralph Baker Jr., Charlie Van Dyke, Michael O'Shea, Dick Heatherton, Chuck Murphy, Dave Ambrose, Jim Tabor, Mike Selden, Ron Chapman, Johnny Dark, Hal Martin, Ken Dowe, Rod Roddy, Cuzzin Lennie, Wes Wise, Bob McCord, Brant Miller, John London, Randy Robbins, Russ Knight, Jim O'Brian, Chuck Dunaway, Ken Knox, Dick Kemp, Dick McCurdy, Jack Woods, Don Keys, Barry Kaye, Bill Stewart, Don Keyes, Buddy McGregor, George Michael, Deano Day, Gary Mack, Don Berns, Ken Reed, Stan Richards, Larry Wilson, Rex Miller, Mike Scott, Don McGregor, Lee Douglas, Jay Lawrence, Bill Ennis, Don Robertson, Bill Robbins, Gary Hamilton, Van Winkle, Coyote, Tony Booth, Gary Owens, Rex Jones and Brice Armstrong, Jack Murray.

As KGBS
In the latter part of 1992, the station lost Limbaugh's program to WBAP.  To make up for the loss, the station hired Ron Engelman to do a midday talk show.  Larry King's syndicated talk show moved to afternoons.  It was about this time that Morton Downey Jr. brought his syndicated radio show to Dallas and hosted it out of the station. (He took a stake in station ownership for a time as well.) It changed call letters to KGBS "Great B-S" and called itself "Hot Talk 1190 - KGBS."

Ron Engelman's show gained a little traction and he developed a devoted, but small, following.  Among the people listening were the Branch Davidians in Waco, about 85 miles south of Dallas.  When the 1993 standoff with the Davidians took place, Engelman found out they were listening and got them to put banners out a window.  His show was devoted to the standoff almost every day until the fiery end. He had calls from all over the world from family members of people still in the compound.  At least two sect members came out of the compound and surrendered after family members were interviewed on Engelman's show.  At one point, Engelman tried to get into the compound, but was turned back by the FBI.  Engelman continued to devote most of his show to the Davidians and the aftermath of the fire for weeks after it happened. Station management was not happy with this and Engelman ultimately announced his departure - to the surprise of management - at the end of a show.

Downey remained at the station for another year or so before moving on, eventually hosting a national weekday television show.

As KDFX
In 1995, Greystone sold the station to Salem Broadcasting, which owns religious radio stations around the U.S.  Salem changed the call letters to KDFX and programmed a conservative talk format, now heard on KSKY.  In early 1997, Salem bought an FM station at 94.9 from CBS and gave CBS the 1190 frequency as part of the deal.

As KOOO
When the switch to CBS ownership took place, the station's call letters were changed to KOOO. First airing October 30, 1996, CBS programmed "Talk 1190" with a syndicated talk radio format including Don Imus, Dr. Joy Browne, Tom Leykis, and Opie & Anthony heard weekdays.

As KLUV
On August 28, 1998, KOOO dropped the talk radio format for 1960s, 70s and 80s oldies, switching to a simulcast of then-sister station KLUV and adopting the KLUV call letters. On September 11 of that year, 1190 KLUV flipped to "Smokin' Oldies", playing 1950s and 60s hits, many of them no longer heard on the FM station's format.  In 2000, Radio One acquired this station from CBS.  The call sign changed to KJOI. It was to become a Christian radio station, but the format change never took place and Radio One quickly sold the station.

As KTRA
In September 2001, the station was acquired by Clear Channel Communications (now known as iHeartMedia) from Radio One for $13 million.  The license was transferred by Clear Channel to Capstar Texas Limited Partnership (a subsidiary of Clear Channel) the same day. After a short "stunt" playing the same song 24/7 for two weeks, the format was changed to a mostly local sports talk format as KTRA ("Xtra Sports 1190"). As the station began airing more syndicated sports shows from Fox Sports Radio, it switched its call sign to KFXR to reflect on its then affiliation.

As KFXR

Fox Sports Radio programming continued until late-March 2004, when the station switched to an all-Beatles format.  In late May 2004, it returned to an oldies format as "Mighty 1190" just two months later.  In 2005, the station switched to a country music format as "Lone Star 1190" and shifted to classic country as "Cowboy 1190" in February 2006.  After four years of music, it once again switched formats to news/talk as "CNN 1190" on March 30, 2008. Programming included a simulcast of the audio of HLN (formerly CNN Headline News).

As HLN relied less on rolling news coverage and more on personality talk, KFXR's format changed from the network's simulcast back to classic country in December 2009.  After several months, the station returned to a mix of talk and brokered shows. In January 2010, this lineup was to include a weekday evening show hosted by Jack E. Jett, but it was cancelled before it even aired, reportedly for Jett's choice of language while being interviewed by Robert Wilonsky for the Dallas Observer.

Initially retaining the "CNN 1190" branding, in early 2010, KFXR rebranded as simply "1190 AM" to reflect on the current format and affiliation. In July 2012, KFXR added Glenn Beck to the midday slot. Programming by this point consisted of an array of news, financial, lifestyle, and entertainment talk shows (mostly brokered) with syndicated talk programs from Glenn Beck and Jerry Doyle plus Coast to Coast AM with George Noory.

On November 14, 2014, KFXR said it would jettison its brokered "DFW 1190 AM" programming and return to talk as "Talk Radio 1190" on November 17, using programming already in iHeartMedia's portfolio. At this time, KFXR ceased its HD Radio digital stereo service.

References

External links

History of KLIF 1190
 DFW Radio Archives
 DFW Radio/TV History
FCC History Cards for KFXR

FXR
News and talk radio stations in the United States
Radio stations established in 1947
1947 establishments in Texas
IHeartMedia radio stations